Transmountain Early College High School, commonly referred to as TMECHS, is the Early College High School for the El Paso Independent School District.  TMECHS participates in the STEM School program, and through collaboration with EPCC, allows students to take courses at its Transmountain Campus and receive an Associate degree before their high school graduation. It has also collaborated with the University of Texas at El Paso to allow its advanced students to attend UTEP courses in their senior year upon the early completion of their associate degree. All TMECHS students graduate under the Texas Distinguished Achievement Plan, which requires that they conduct original research under the guidance of professionals in their field.  Its students are representative of all geographic areas of the city. A lottery and interview process are used to select the 125 student freshman class each year since 2008.

Accelerated Graduation Plan
The TMECHS administration have designed and successfully implemented a program to allow advanced TMECHS students to complete their associate degrees by the end of their Junior year, and to attend UTEP courses their senior year. The first 27 of these early graduates have successfully completed their EPCC degrees and moved on to 4 year universities.  An arrangement was established by the school district to provide bus transportation for TMECHS students to and from UTEP by sharing the bus route already in place for the International Baccalaureate program students of Coronado High School.

Student spaceflight experiment
On STS-134, the Space Shuttle Endeavour launched with the science experiment "Effect of Microgravity on Biofilm Formation by E. coli on Polystyrene Particles" designed by TMECHS Juniors Jarisma Rodriguez and Michelle Holguin, as part of the NCESSE Student Spaceflight Experiments Program. STS-134 was the final mission of the Space Shuttle Endeavour and the penultimate mission of NASA's Space Shuttle program.

Admission
To qualify for admission, students must:
 Pass the 8th grade TAKS on the first attempt.
 Maintain at least a 70% average in Middle School.
 Send in an application.
 Conduct an interview.

Sports
TMECHS does not offer school-sponsored competitive sports. However, it does offer intramural sports including American football, volleyball, soccer, and basketball.

Music
TMECHS offers band, orchestra, piano, and guitar as electives, and does participate in district-sponsored musical competitions such as Solo & Ensemble or All-Region competitions on an individual basis.

Clubs
 Glee Club
 Robotics
 Student Government
 Yearbook
 UIL
 Mock Trial
 Academic Decathlon
 National Honor Society
 Community Service
 Super SAC
 Announcement Crew
 Talent Show Crew
 High Q
 Mu Alpha Theta
 Karaoke Lunch
 Film Club
 TMECHS eSports Club

Available Degree Plans
This is a comprehensive list of the associate degree plans available for TMECHS students.

Associate of Science
 Architecture
 Biology
 Biological Sciences-Pre Dentistry
 Biological Sciences-Pre Medicine,
 Biological Sciences-Pre Pharmacy
 Biological Sciences-Pre Veterinary
 Chemistry
 General Studies
 Geological Sciences
 Mathematics
 Physics

Associate of Arts
 Computer Science
 Civil Engineering
 Computer Engineering
 Electrical/Electronic Engineering
 Industrial/Mechanical/Metallurgical/Materials Engineering
 Teacher Preparation

References

External links
 
 GreatSchools.org Review

El Paso Independent School District high schools
High schools in El Paso, Texas
Early College High Schools
University-affiliated schools in the United States
Charter schools in Texas
University of Texas at El Paso